William Ryder may refer to:
 William Ryder (rugby union) (born 1982), Fijian rugby union footballer
 William T. Ryder (1913–1992), first American paratrooper, later a brigadier general
William Ryder (mayor), Lord Mayor of London
William Ryder (MP) for Totnes

See also
William Rider, English historian and priest
Bill Ryder-Jones, musician